The Wyoming Republican Party is the affiliate of the Republican Party in Wyoming. It is currently the dominant party in the state, and is one of the strongest affiliates of the national Republican Party. The party currently controls Wyoming's at-large U.S. House seat, both U.S. Senate seats, the governorship, and has nearly unanimous positions in both houses of the state legislature.

In 2021, the Wyoming Republican Party voted to stop recognizing Liz Cheney as a Republican. Cheney had criticized former president Donald Trump for attempting to overturn the 2020 election results after he lost the election and inciting a pro-Trump mob to assault the U.S. Capitol. In 2022, the Wyoming Republican Party supported a primary challenger against Cheney.

Members of Congress

U.S. Senate

U.S. House of Representatives

Statewide offices 
 Governor: Mark Gordon
 Secretary of State: Edward Buchanan
 State Auditor: Kristi Racines
 State Treasurer: Curt Meier
 Superintendent of Public Instruction: Jillian Balow

Legislative leaders 
 President of the Senate: Drew Perkins
 Senate Majority Leader: Dan Dockstader
 Speaker of the House: Steve Harshman
 House Majority Leader: David Miller

Election results

Presidential

Gubernatorial

See also
 List of state parties of the Republican Party (United States)
 Political party strength in Wyoming
 Democratic Party of Wyoming
 Wyoming Libertarian Party

References

Notes
A.Although Wyoming's sole member of the United States House of Representatives Liz Cheney is a member of the House Republican Conference, the Party's Wyoming affiliate stopped recognizing her as a Republican and affiliate member.

External links
 Wyoming Republican Party

Wyoming
Republican Party